Daniela Klemenschits (13 November 1982 – 9 April 2008) was an Austrian professional tennis player. She won a total of 23 doubles titles on the ITF Circuit in her career.

Early life
Daniela and twin sister Sandra (fellow pro-player) were born in Vienna, Austria.

Tennis career
Daniela played doubles with sister Sandra on the WTA Tour and the ITF Women's Circuit. The team dominated doubles tennis in Austria in the mid-2000s, becoming the country's No. 1 team in 2006. Daniela won a total of 23 titles on the ITF-level and reached one final on the WTA Tour-level. She reached the top 100 of the WTA doubles rankings in 2005. Daniela also represented Austria on the Fed Cup in 2005, when they defeated Switzerland.

Daniela played her final professional match on 14 December 2006 in Valasske Mezirici, Czech Republic, partnering sister Sandra and losing in round one against Eva Hrdinová and Stanislava Hrozenská, 5–7, 2–6.

Death
In January 2007, both Klemenschits twins were diagnosed with a rare form of abdominal cancer, squamous cell carcinoma, forcing their retirement. Fellow tennis players rallied for Klemenschits and donated money to pay off the removal of several tumours and the expensive medical care required. Daniela died on 9 April 2008 in Salzburg, aged 25. Sandra, however, survived and returned to the doubles tour in July 2008.

WTA career finals

Doubles: 1 (runner-up)

ITF finals

Singles: 4 (0–4)

Doubles: 56 (23–33)

References

External links
 
 
 

1982 births
2008 deaths
Tennis players from Vienna
Austrian female tennis players
Deaths from cancer in Austria
Austrian twins
Twin sportspeople
20th-century Austrian women
21st-century Austrian women